Adelpha eulalia, the Arizona sister, is a species of butterfly in the family Nymphalidae. It occurs from at least Guatemala and Mexico to the southwestern United States, including southeastern California, Arizona, New Mexico, and southern Texas. They can also sometimes be found in Oklahoma, Kansas, Colorado, Utah, and Nevada.

Adelpha eulalia belongs to the serpa species group in the genus Adelpha (sisters). It was previously treated as a subspecies of Bredow's sister (Adelpha bredowii). Recent phylogenetic studies, however, conclude that morphological, geographical, and genetic evidence make it clear that it is a separate species.

See also
Adelpha californica, the California sister

References

Nymphalidae of South America
Adelpha
Butterflies described in 1848
Butterflies of North America
Taxa named by Edward Doubleday